The history of the administrative divisions of China is covered in the following articles:

 History of the administrative divisions of China before 1912
 History of the administrative divisions of China (1912–1949) (Republic of China on the mainland)
 History of the administrative divisions of China (1949–present) (People's Republic of China)

See also
 General History of Chinese Administrative Divisions, 13-volume book series
 Administrative divisions of China
 Districts of Hong Kong
 Municipal Affairs Bureau (Macau: Municipalities and Parishes)
 Administrative divisions of Taiwan (Republic of China)

Administrative divisions of China
Former administrative divisions of China